Bai Fatima Ainee Limbona-Sinsuat is a Filipina politician who currently serves as the Governor of Maguindanao del Norte. She became the Vice Governor of Maguindanao on June 30, 2022, after winning the election. Under an act of Congress, she became the first Governor of Maguindanao del Norte, following Maguindanao plebiscite that split Maguindanao into two provinces.

Notes

References 

Living people
Year of birth missing (living people)
People from Maguindanao
Governors of Maguindanao del Norte
Nacionalista Party politicians